Rezin Orr Academy High School is a public four-year high school bordered between the neighborhoods of West Garfield and Humboldt Park located on the West Side of Chicago, Illinois. It is a part of the Chicago Public Schools district and is managed by the Academy for Urban School Leadership. The school is named after labor leader Rezin Orr.

History
Orr traces its origins to 1918, when it was opened as an elementary school. It began hosting high school students in the 1920s, when it became a branch of Austin High School. From the 1940s to the 1950s, Orr was used a vocational school for seventh and eighth grade boys, and for a short period it served as a temporary home for Our Lady of the Angels School after that school was ravaged by a fire in 1958. Orr was then used as a branch of Marshall High School before becoming an independent high school in 1963. Orr moved into a new building in 1973. The current school building was designed by the firm of Ludwig Mies van der Rohe.

Athletics
Orr competes in the Chicago Public League (CPL) and is a member of the Illinois High School Association (IHSA). The boys' basketball team were state champions in 2016-2017, 2017-2018 and 2018-2019.

Notable alumni 
 Jay Davis, professional baseball player

References

External links
 School website

Educational institutions established in 1918
Public high schools in Chicago
1918 establishments in Illinois